The 1988 Lucas Supersprint was the eleventh and final round of the 1988 World Sports-Prototype Championship.  It took place at Sandown Raceway, Victoria, Australia on 20 November 1988.

Due to being a short sprint and thus having a smaller points scale for the championship, several teams, most notably the Porsches of Brun Motorsport, Joest Racing, Kremer Racing, and Richard Lloyd Racing, opted not to attend this event.

Unlike the previous World Endurance Championship race held at Sandown in 1984 which included an invitation class for cars that competed in the Australian GT and Sports Car championships, the Lucas Supersprint was open to WSPC cars only. The only local entry was the Bernie van Elsen entered Veskanda Chevrolet driven by touring car stars John Bowe and Dick Johnson (Bowe was the car's driver when it dominated the 1986 Australian Sports Car Championship). The car was able to race as although it had been built to conform to Australia's Group A Sports Car rules, it also met the FIA's Group C rules as well as conforming to IMSA regulations.

Official results
Class winners in bold.  Cars failing to complete 75% of the winner's distance marked as Not Classified (NC).

† - The #26 Veskanda-Chevrolet of John Bowe and Dick Johnson was disqualified for using more fuel than the regulations allowed.

Statistics
 Pole Position - Jean-Louis Schlesser - Team Sauber Mercedes - 1:28.620
 Fastest Lap - Jean-Louis Schlesser - Team Sauber Mercedes - 1:33.580
 Average Speed - 144.355 km/h

References

 
 
 
 

Sandown
Sandown
Motorsport at Sandown